The 2002 Commonwealth of Independent States Cup was the tenth edition of the competition between the champions of former republics of Soviet Union. It was won by Dynamo Kyiv for the fourth time overall (first since 1998). After three seasons played with two divisions, the tournament was reverted to the previous format (used from 1996 till 1998).

Participants

Group stage

Group A

Results

Group B
Unofficial table

Official table

Results

Group C

Results

Group D

Results

Final rounds

Quarterfinals

Semifinals

Final

Top scorers

External links
2002 CIS Cup at rsssf.com
2002 CIS Cup at football.by
2002 CIS Cup at kick-off.by

2002
2002 in Russian football
2001–02 in Ukrainian football
2001–02 in European football
January 2002 sports events in Russia
2002 in Moscow